Proto-Totonacan or Proto-Totonac-Tepehua (abbreviated PTn or PTT) is the hypothetical common ancestor of the Totonacan languages of Mexico. It was first reconstructed using comparative methods in 1953 by Evangelina Arana Osnaya. Some linguists have proposed a link between the Totonacan and Mixe–Zoque language families; therefore making Proto-Totonacan a sister language of Proto-Mixe–Zoque and descendant of Proto-Totozoquean.

Phonology

Consonants

 Notes
 MacKay and Trechsel (2018) add ejective stops and affricates.
 Davletshin (2008) and Brown et al. (2011) add /ʔ/ and /h/. MacKay and Trechsel (2018) accept /ʔ/ but reject /h/.

Vowels

 Notes
 Brown et al. (2011) accept this vowel inventory. 
 MacKay and Trechsel (2018) reject laryngealized vowels in Proto-Totonacan. They argue that laryngealized vowels in the Totonac languages  are too infrequent and erratic after fricatives and sonorants to support their reconstruction.

Lexicon
The following Proto-Totonac-Tepehua reconstructions are from MacKay and Trechsel (2018).

{| class="wikitable sortable"
! no. !! gloss !! Proto-Totonac-Tepehua
|-
| 1 || ‘spicy’ || *ɬkaka
|-
| 2 || ‘ash(es)’ || *ɬk’ak’a
|-
| 3 || ‘dances’ || *ƛ’ii-ya
|-
| 4 || ‘vomits’ || *p’aƛ’an-ya
|-
| 5 || ‘ear of corn’ || *ƛ’aqƛ’a
|-
| 6 || ‘counts’ || *puuƛ’aq’i-ya
|-
| 7 || ‘walks’ || *ƛ’aawan-ya
|-
| 8 || ‘pot’, ‘pitcher’ || *ƛ’amank
|-
| 9 || ‘bends’, ‘breaks’, ‘twists’ || *taƛ’aq’i-ya
|-
| 10 || ‘ripe’, ‘mature’ || *k’aƛa’
|-
| 11 || ‘wins’, ‘earns’ || *ƛaha-ya
|-
| 12 || ‘tires’, ‘gets tired’ || *ƛaqwan-ya
|-
| 13 || ‘talks to X’, ‘greets X’ || šaqaƛii-ya
|-
| 14 || ‘makes’, ‘does’ || *ƛawa-ya
|-
| 15 || ‘avocado tree’ || *kukaƛiiɬi
|-
| 16 || ‘nettle’ || *qahni
|-
| 17 || ‘lime (mineral)’ || *qaštah
|-
| 18 || ‘dust’, ‘powder’ || *puqšni
|-
| 19 || ‘flea’ || *aq¢’iis
|-
| 20 || ‘wasp’ || *qalaati
|-
| 21 || ‘turtle’ || *qahin
|-
| 22 || ‘knee’ || *¢uqutni
|-
| 23 || ‘tomato’ || *paqɬča
|-
| 24 || ‘plays’ || qamaanan-ya
|-
| 25 || ‘whistles’ || *squli-ya
|-
| 26 || ‘infant’, ‘baby’ || *sq’at’a
|-
| 27 || ‘heron’ || *luuq’u
|-
| 28 || ‘tongue’ || *siimaq’aati
|-
| 29 || ‘egg’ || *q’aɬwaati
|-
| 30 || ‘yucca’ || *q’ušq’ihu
|-
| 31 || ‘gourd’ || *q’aaši
|-
| 32 || ‘washes X’ || *č’aq’aa-ya
|-
| 33 || ‘salty’ || *sq’uq’u
|-
| 34 || ‘steals’, ‘steals X’ || *q’aɬa-
|-
| 35 || ‘remembers’, ‘remembers X’ || *paastak’-ya
|-
| 36 || ‘piles X up’ || *maast’uq’-ya
|-
| 37 || ‘drinks’, ‘drinks X’ || *q’ut’-ya
|-
| 38 || ‘hears’, ‘hears X’ || *qašmat’-ya
|-
| 39 || ‘returns’ || *tasp’it’-ya
|-
| 40 || ‘cuts X’ || *sit’-ya
|-
| 41 || ‘squeezes X’ || *č’it’-ya
|-
| 42 || ‘unties X’ || *škut’-ya
|-
| 43 || ‘picks X up’ || *sak’-ya
|-
| 44 || ‘writes’, ‘writes X’ || *¢’uq’-ya
|-
| 45 || ‘foam’ || *puputi
|-
| 46 || ‘neck-related (body-part prefix)’ || *piš-
|-
| 47 || ‘pig’ || *p’ašni
|-
| 48 || ‘cuts X’ || *p’uš-ya
|-
| 49 || ‘louse’ || *skaata
|-
| 50 || ‘sleeps’ || *ɬtata-ya
|-
| 51 || ‘two’ || *-t’uy
|-
| 52 || ‘sells X’ || *st’aa-ya
|-
| 53 || ‘mouth’ || *kiɬni
|-
| 54 || ‘hand-related (body-part prefix)’ || *maka-
|-
| 55 || ‘knows X’ || *k’a¢ii-ya
|-
| 56 || ‘year’ || *k’aata
|-
| 57 || ‘tooth-related (body-part prefix)’ || *ta¢a-
|-
| 58 || ‘breast’ || *¢’ík’iiti
|-
| 59 || ‘stone’ || *čiwiš
|-
| 60 || ‘sugar cane’ || *č’ankati
|-
| 61 || ‘rain’ || *saʔiini
|-
| 62 || ‘blows X’ || *sunu-ya
|-
| 63 || ‘sweet’ || *saqsi(ʔ)
|-
| 64 || ‘bitter’ || *suuni
|-
| 65 || ‘eats’ || *wahin-ya
|-
| 66 || ‘is lying down’, ‘is supine’ || *maa-ɬi
|-
| 67 || ‘lizard’ || *slul
|-
| 68 || ‘is seated’ || *wii-ɬi
|-
| 69 || ‘liver’ || *ɬwak’ak’a
|-
| 70 || ‘throws X’, ‘throws X away’ || *maq’an-ya
|}

See also
 Totonacan languages
 Totozoquean languages

Notes

References

Totonacan languages
Totonacan